John James Kingsbury (1853 – 2 August 1939) was a crown prosecutor and member of the Queensland Legislative Assembly.

Early years
Kingsbury was born and educated in Dublin, Ireland, graduating with a Master of Arts from Trinity College. He arrived in Melbourne, Australia in 1878 where he helped start up a business, Henry Brookes & Co. Kingsbury moved to Queensland in the 1880s as manager of Beale and Co. and in 1886 became a director of the Queensland Deposit Bank before returning to Ireland in 1887 for a year.

Political career
For the 1893 Queensland elections, Kingsbury with his knowledge of finance, was asked to stand as a Ministerialist candidate alongside Thomas McIlwraith for the seat of Brisbane North. The pair were successful in the two member seat, convincingly defeating their opponents, Charles Lilley, Thomas Glassey and Nathaniel Raven.

Kingsbury held the seat until the 1896 elections, where he lost to Robert Fraser who also claimed to be a Ministerialist candidate. Whilst in politics, Kingsbury took up law and in 1896 was appointed Crown Prosecutor of the Supreme Court of Queensland.

Personal life
Kingsbury married Elizabeth Jane Ham (died 1919), eldest daughter of David Ham of Ballarat, in November 1879 and together had three sons and one daughter. He was a former President of the Queensland Irish Association and played a leading part in the affairs on the Albert Street Methodist Church.

Kingsbury died in Glen Iris, Victoria, in August 1939.

References

Members of the Queensland Legislative Assembly
1853 births
1939 deaths
19th-century Australian politicians
Politicians from Dublin (city)
Alumni of Trinity College Dublin
Politicians from Queensland
Irish emigrants to colonial Australia